Anastasia Andreyevna Gubanova (born 20 August 2000) is a Russian pair skater. With partner Alexei Sintsov, she won gold at the 2015 ISU Junior Grand Prix in the United States and competed at two World Junior Championships, placing fourth in 2015.

Career 
Gubanova began skating in 2007.

Partnership with Sintsov 
Gubanova teamed up with Alexei Sintsov in 2011. The pair placed fourth at the 2015 World Junior Championships in Tallinn, Estonia.

Gubanova/Sintsov started the 2015–16 JGP season by taking gold in Colorado Springs, Colorado, finishing 3.54 points ahead of silver medalists Joy Weinberg / Maximiliano Fernandez. They won bronze in Toruń, Poland, sharing the podium with Ekaterina Borisova / Dmitry Sopot (gold) and Amina Atakhanova / Ilia Spiridonov (silver). These results qualified them for the  2015–16 JGP Final in Barcelona, where they finished fourth. Gubanova/Sintsov finished 8th at the Russian Championships and fourth at the junior level. Named as alternates for the 2016 World Junior Championships, they were called up when an injury led Atakhanova/Spiridonov to withdraw. They placed 11th in both segments and 11th overall at the event in Debrecen, Hungary.

Programs 
(with Sintsov)

Competitive highlights 
JGP: Junior Grand Prix

With Sintsov

References

External links 

 

2000 births
Russian female pair skaters
Living people
People from Orenburg Oblast
Sportspeople from Orenburg Oblast